Miguel Ángel may refer to:

 Miguel Ángel (given name)
 Miguel Ángel (footballer, born 1947), Spanish football goalkeeper
 Miguel Ángel (footballer, born 1978), Spanish football manager and defensive midfielder
 Miguel Ángel (footballer, born 1993), Spanish football winger for Gubbio
 Miguel Ángel (footballer, born 1996), Spanish football right-back
 Miguel Ángel (footballer, born March 1998), Spanish football defender for Getafe
 Miguel Ángel (footballer, born May 1998), Spanish football forward for Albacete

See also
 
 
Michelangelo (disambiguation)